Montrouge may refer to:
 Montrouge, a commune in the southern Parisian suburbs
 Montrouge (actor) (born Louis Émile Hesnard), a French actor and theatre manager